See also Woolf, Woolfe, Wolff, Wolfson and Woolfson (especially for family names).

Wolfson or Volfson is a Jewish surname, and may refer to:
 David Wolfson, Baron Wolfson of Sunningdale (born 1935), British politician and businessman, nephew of Isaac Wolfson, former chairman of GUS and Next
 Elliot R. Wolfson, professor of Hebrew and Judaic studies at New York University
 Elijah Wolfson, (born 1985) American writer and editor 
 Evan Wolfson, (born 1957), prominent American civil rights attorney and advocate
 Freda L. Wolfson (born 1954), United States District Judge in New Jersey
 Harry Austryn Wolfson, (1887–1974), professor of literature and philosophy at Harvard
 Ilia Volfson (born 1981), Russian politician
 Isaac Wolfson, (1897–1991), British businessman and philanthropist, former chairman of GUS
 Janet Wolfson de Botton (born 1952), British art collector and bridge player
 Leonard Wolfson, Baron Wolfson, (born 1927), British businessman, son of Isaac Wolfson, former chairman of GUS
 Louis Wolfson, (born 1912), Wall Street financier and a major thoroughbred race horse owner and breeder
 Louis Wolfson, (born 1931), American author who writes in French 
 Margaret Wolfson, American storyteller and writer
 Mark Wolfson (1934–2018), British politician
 Mitchell Wolfson, Jr., (born 1939), businessman and founder of the Wolfsonian Museum
 P. J. Wolfson (1903–1979), American writer, screenwriter, and film producer
 Richard Wolfson (musician), (1955–2005), Israeli musician and journalist
 Richard Wolfson (physicist)
 Simon Wolfson, Baron Wolfson of Aspley Guise (born 1967), son of David Wolfson, chairman of clothing retailer Next
 Theresa Wolfson, (1897–1972), labor activist and educator
 Tracy Wolfson (born 1975), sports reporter
Zev Wolfson (Born 1928) Jewish businessman and philanthropist 

Woolfson is another variation of this surname, and may refer to:

 Eric Woolfson (1945–2009), Scottish singer and producer
 Luke de Woolfson (born 1976), English actor 
 Michael Woolfson (1927–2019), British physicist

Jewish surnames
Yiddish-language surnames